Kashi Kicks is an American footwear company based in Pittsburgh, Pennsylvania that produces unique sneaker designs. Kashi Kicks was developed as a more fashion-oriented line compared to other brands at the time, in both aesthetic and function. The shoes are endorsed by a number of members of the hip hop and professional athletic communities including George Clinton, Flavor Flav, Talib Kweli, Joey Porter, Nino Storm and Ginuwine.

In August 2007, Kashi Kicks announced the release of the Liberace shoe, to honor "the King of Bling". This was done in collaboration with the Liberace Foundation of Las Vegas.

Kashi Kicks connects with the streets using innovative promotional mixtape marketing. To date Kashi Kicks has sponsored mixtapes done by DJs like DJ Age, DJ Fade, DJ Daaone, DJ L-Gee, DJ Stacks, DJ Kenny Kaign, DJ Scrill, DJ Gloss, DJ Flaco, DJ Scream, DJ Blurray, DJ Spinz, DJ Haze, DJ Prodege, DJ Warrior & Julian Ramirez, DJ Delz, DJ Furious, Team EXT, Spaz, Rockie Fontaine & DJ Rokz.

References

External links
Official Website

Shoe brands
2000s fashion
Clothing companies of the United States
Companies based in Pittsburgh